Koru is a luxury custom superyacht being constructed for Jeff Bezos, the founder of Amazon and one of the world's richest persons. The vessel was being built in the Netherlands by Oceanco in 2021. If commissioned, the yacht will be the second-largest sailing yacht in the world, after Andrey Melnichenko's Sailing Yacht A.

Koru and De Hef 

In 2022, Rotterdam announced that the De Hef bridge, a historic bridge in the city, would be partially dismantled, temporarily, to fit the yacht through. The move is very controversial because it is now a Dutch national monument because of its long history. According to Agence France-Presse, the mayor's office stated that the idea was spurred by the jobs created by the vessel's construction and that the bridge would be reconstructed in its current form. In response to reports that this would happen in 2022 and criticism of this, Rotterdam mayor Ahmed Aboutaleb stated in February of that year that no permit has yet been applied for.  Later reports indicated that plans to temporarily remove a section of De Hef have been shelved, leaving it unclear whether Koru will be finished as is, and how it will sail down the river if it remains of the same dimensions. Partially dismantling the 'De Hef' bridge appeared to be unnecessary. The masts were mounted downstream of the bridge in the Rotterdam Harbour.

See also
List of large sailing yachts

References

External links
 OCEANCO Y721 at Boat International, with images

Individual yachts
Sailing yachts built in the Netherlands